Ooceraea is a genus of ants in the subfamily Dorylinae containing approximately 16 described species. The genus is distributed across the Australasia, Indomalaya, Malagasy, Neotropical, Oceania, and Palearctic bioregions. Ooceraea was described by Roger (1862) and later placed as a junior synonym of Cerapachys by Brown (1973).  Ooceraea was resurrected as a valid genus by Borowiec (2016) during redescription of the doryline genera.

Species

Ooceraea alii 
Ooceraea australis 
Ooceraea besucheti 
Ooceraea biroi 
Ooceraea coeca 
Ooceraea crypta 
Ooceraea decamera 
Ooceraea fragosa 
Ooceraea fuscior 
Ooceraea guizhouensis 
Ooceraea joshii 
Ooceraea octoantenna 
Ooceraea papuana 
Ooceraea pawa 
Ooceraea pusilla 
Ooceraea quadridentata

References

Dorylinae
Ant genera